

Matches

Legend

Bundesliga

League table

ÖFB-Cup

UEFA Europa League

3rd Round 

|}

Play-off-round

|}

References

2010-11
Austrian football clubs 2010–11 season